The 2011 Nebelhorn Trophy took place on September 21–24, 2011 at the Eislaufzentrum Oberstdorf. It is held annually in Oberstdorf, Germany and is named after the Nebelhorn, a nearby mountain.

It was one of the first international senior competitions of the season. Skaters were entered by their respective national federations and competed in four disciplines: men's singles, ladies' singles, pair skating, and ice dance. The Fritz-Geiger-Memorial Trophy was presented to the team with the highest placements across all disciplines.

Overview
In men's singles, Yuzuru Hanyu of Japan, Stephen Carriere from the United States, and Russian Zhan Bush were the leaders after the short program. Bush was the only skater to land a clean quad jump in this segment of the competition; it was also the first one he had landed in competition. Hanyu finished 1st in the free skate to win the event, while Michal Březina and Carriere won silver and bronze, respectively.

American Mirai Nagasu won the ladies' short program, followed by Georgia's Elene Gedevanishvili, and Germany's Sarah Hecken. Nagasu went on to win the gold, Gedevanishvili the silver, and Sweden's Joshi Helgesson moved up to take the bronze.

Russians Tatiana Volosozhar / Maxim Trankov, Americans Caydee Denney / John Coughlin, and Germans Maylin Hausch / Daniel Wende were the top three pairs in the short program. Denney and Coughlin were making their international debut together. Volosozhar and Trankov won the free skate and the event, while Vera Bazarova / Yuri Larionov finished second. Denney and Coughlin were fourth in the long program and finished third overall.

In the ice dance event, Germany's Nelli Zhiganshina / Alexander Gazsi won the short dance, followed by Americans Madison Hubbell / Zachary Donohue and Canadians Kharis Ralph / Asher Hill. Hubbell and Donohue, skating in their first international competition together, went on to win the free dance and the competition.

Schedule

Entries

Results

Men

Ladies

Pairs

Ice dance

References

External links
 2011 Nebelhorn Trophy Official website
 2011 Nebelhorn Trophy results

Nebelhorn Trophy
Nebelhorn
Nebelhorn Trophy